Mark Metcalf (born March 11, 1946) is an American television and film actor often playing the role of an antagonistic and aggrieved authority figure.

He is best known for his role as sadistic ROTC officer Douglas C. Neidermeyer in the 1978 American comedy film Animal House, a character he later emulated in the 1984 music videos for the songs "We're Not Gonna Take It" and "I Wanna Rock" by the heavy metal band Twisted Sister.

He is also known for playing the role of The Maestro on two episodes of the sitcom Seinfeld as well as for his recurring role as The Master on the supernatural drama series Buffy the Vampire Slayer and its spin-off series Angel.

Early life
Metcalf was born in Findlay, Ohio. His father was a civil engineer. Metcalf was raised in Webster Groves, Missouri, a suburb of St. Louis. In 1959, he moved with his family to New Jersey where he attended Westfield High School, graduating in 1964.

Metcalf enrolled in the engineering program at the University of Michigan. It was at university that he performed in his first stage play, which was a production of Shakespeare's Henry VI. His first professional acting job was with the Milwaukee Repertory Theater in 1971. In the early 1970s, he moved to New York City performing in both classical and modern theater, eventually moving westward to work in film.

Career
Metcalf's first major Hollywood film role was that of ROTC cadet officer Douglas Neidermeyer in the 1978 comedy Animal House. Metcalf had originally auditioned for the role of ladies' man Eric "Otter" Stratton (played by Tim Matheson in the film). In 1984, Metcalf played characters similar to Neidermeyer in the Twisted Sister music videos for the songs "We're Not Gonna Take It", where he played an authoritarian father, and "I Wanna Rock", where he played an authoritarian high school teacher.

In the 1980s and 1990s, Metcalf landed guest roles on multiple television shows including Miami Vice, Walker, Texas Ranger and Party of Five. He also played recurring roles on shows such as Hill Street Blues, Teen Angel, Star Trek: Voyager, Ally McBeal and JAG. In 1993 he moved to Hollywood.

One of Metcalf's more memorable television characters was his role in an episode during the seventh season of Seinfeld titled "The Maestro". In the episode he played a self-absorbed conductor who was dating character Elaine Benes (Julia Louis-Dreyfus) and who insisted on being referred to as "Maestro". Metcalf reprised the role in an episode later that same season titled "The Doll".

From 1997 to 2002, Metcalf played the vampire known as The Master on several episodes of the series Buffy the Vampire Slayer and its spin-off series Angel.

In 2000, Metcalf left Los Angeles and moved to Bayside, Wisconsin with his then wife, Elizabeth "Libby" Wick and their son, Julius. Metcalf had moved to Wisconsin to start a restaurant with his wife and with no intent on continuing with acting, due to raising a child with special needs. However, Metcalf was approached by the director of First Stage Children's Theater in Milwaukee to act in one of their plays and Metcalf went on to act in several of their productions. In conjunction with the Milwaukee Film Festival, Metcalf produced a short film each year based on a screenplay written by a high school student enrolled in the Student Screenwriting Competition, a program developed by Metcalf to teach the craft of screenwriting to young people. Metcalf also contributed articles about film as a correspondent for the online magazine OnMilwaukee.

In 2009, Metcalf played the role of Mayor Johnson on an episode of the third season of Mad Men titled "Souvenir".

After moving to Missoula, Montana in 2013, Metcalf once again became involved in local theatre, playing the role of Scrooge in a production of Charles Dickens' A Christmas Carol presented by the University of Montana School of Theatre and Dance.

In 2019, Metcalf played the role of Sheriff Roy in Tate Bunker's film The Field alongside Barry Bostwick and Veronica Cartwright. Metcalf was the subject of Vera Brunner-Sung's documentary short Character that premiered at the Sundance Film Festival in 2020. Metcalf met Brunner-Sung through a mutual friend after moving to Columbus, Ohio.

Personal life
Metcalf has one son, Julius, with Elizabeth "Libby" Wick. The couple moved from Los Angeles, California to Bayside, Wisconsin in 2000. They owned and operated a restaurant in nearby Mequon, Wisconsin called Libby Montana. Metcalf filed for divorce in 2003 and since 2006 Wick has been the sole owner of the restaurant.

In 2013, Metcalf moved to Missoula, Montana, to be closer to Julius, who was a student at the University of Montana.

Filmography

Film

Television

References

External links 

1946 births
Living people
Male actors from Ohio
Male actors from Milwaukee
American male film actors
American male television actors
People from Bayside, Wisconsin
People from Findlay, Ohio
People from Westfield, New Jersey
University of Michigan College of Engineering alumni
Westfield High School (New Jersey) alumni